The 2011–12 Penn State Nittany Lions men's basketball team represents Pennsylvania State University. Head coach Pat Chambers is in his first season with the team. The team played its home games in University Park, Pennsylvania, US at the Bryce Jordan Center (which has a capacity of 15,000) for the thirteenth consecutive season. They finished with a record of 12–20 overall, 4–14 in Big Ten play for a tied for a last place finish with Nebraska. They lost in the lost in the first round of the 2012 Big Ten Conference men's basketball tournament by Indiana.

Coaching staff

Roster

Schedule and results

|-
!colspan=9| Exhibition

|-
!colspan=9| Regular season

|-
!colspan=9| Big Ten tournament

References

Penn State
Penn State Nittany Lions basketball seasons